Dieidolycus is a genus of marine ray-finned fishes belonging to the family Zoarcidae, the eelpouts. The genus comprises three species which are found in the western central Pacific, southeastern Pacific and Southern Oceans.

Taxonomy
This genus is classified within the subfamily Lycodinae, one of 4 subfamilies in the family Zoarcidae, the eelpouts. This genus is apparently related to the clade which includes the genera Lycodes and Lycenchelys, sometimes called the Lycodini, but its derived characters, adaptations for deep sea life led it to be classified as a separate genus.

Species
Dieidolycus has three species:

Characteristics
Deiedolycus eelpouts have robust bodies which have a depth that is roughly 10% of their standard length. The skin is gelatinous and transparent and the muscles,bones and fin rays are clearly visible through the skin. They have no scales or lateral lines, although the sensory pores on the head are enlarged. The gills slit reaches vertically to the middle of the base of the pectoral fin.

Distribution and habitat
Deiedolycus eelpouts are bathydemersal fishes found in the Pacific Ocean. D. leptodermatus Is found in the Southern Ocean, D. gosztonyii is found in the southeastern Pacific off Chile and D. adocetus in the Bismarck Sea.

References

Lycodinae